Since the development of the university sector in Canada a small number of Vice Chancellors (President/Principal) have served for 15 years or more. They include:

38 years: Sir John Dawson CMG (McGill 1855-93);

34 years: Cecil Jones (New Brunswick 1906-40);

33 years: Jasper Nicolls (Bishop's 1845-78);

32 years: John McCaul (Toronto 1848-80);

31 years: Edwin Jacob (New Brunswick 1829-60);

26 years: John Forrest (Dalhousie 1885-1911), Arthur McGreer (Bishop's 1922-48), David Johnston CC (Waterloo 1999-2010, McGill 1979-94);

25 years: Artemas Sawyer (Arcadia 1869-96), George Grant CMG (Queen's 1877-1902), Sir Robert Falconer KCMG (Toronto 1907-32), Leonard Klinck (British Columbia 1919-44),  Frederic Patterson (Arcadia 1923-48);

24 years: William Jack (New Brunswick 1861-85), Sir William Peterson KCMG (McGill 1885-1919);

23 years: Frank James (McGill 1939-62);

22 years: James Ross (Dalhousie 1863-85);

21 years: John Strachan (Toronto 1827-48), Thomas Harrison (New Brunswick 1885-1906), James MacLean (Manitoba 1913-34);

20 years: Henry Tory (Alberta 1908-20), Arthur McKenzie (Dalhousie 1911-31), Sherwood Fox (Western Ontario 1927-47), George Hall (Western Ontario 1947-67), Paul Davenport OC (Western Ontario 1994-2009, Alberta 1989-94);

19 years: Albert Hatcher (Memorial 1933-52), Roger Guindon (Ottawa 1965-84);

18 years: Norman MacKenzie CC CMG (British Columbia 1944-62);

17 years: James Somerville (New Brunswick 1811-28), Henry Hicks CC (Dalhousie 1963-80), Ross Paul CM (Windsor 1998-2008, Laurentian 1991-98);

16 years: Watson Kirkconnell OC (Arcadia 1948-64), Hugh Saunderson (Manitoba 1954-70);

15 years: Robert Wallace CMG (Queen's 1936-51), Howard Petch OBC (Victoria 1975-90), George Pedersen OC (Western Ontario 1985-94, British Columbia 1983-85, Simon Fraser 1979-83), Gerald Kelly (MacEwan 1981-96), Peter George CM (McMaster 1995-2010).

This list of Canadian university leaders includes the chancellors and vice-chancellors of Canadian universities.  In most cases, the chancellor is an outside ceremonial head, while the vice-chancellor is the on-site academic leader.  The vice-chancellor usually holds the position of president.

See also
Lists of university leaders
List of universities in Canada

References

University leaders

lists
leaders
Canada